Abeille may refer to:

Ships
HMS Abeille (1796), a ship of the Royal Navy
Abeille Bourbon, a high sea tow vessel
Abeille Flandre, a high sea tug of the French navy
Abeille Liberté, a salvage tug
Abeille Provence, a salvage tug, later the Ryan Leet
ST Abeille No 7, a tug, originally the Empire Helen
ST Abeille No 8, a tug, originally the Empire Simon
ST Abeille No 22, a tug, originally the Empire Alfred
ST Abeille No 23, a tug, originally the Empire Sprite

People
 Abeille de Perrin (1843-1910), full name Elzéar Emmanuel Arène Abeille de Perrin, French entomologist
 Scipion Abeille (died 1697), French physician
 Gaspard Abeille (1648-1718), French poet
Pierre-César Abeille (1674-after 1733), French composer
Guy Abeille, French economist
Louis Paul Abeille (1719-1807), French economist
 Ludwig Abeille (1761-1838), German pianist and composer
Rafael Nieto Abeillé, Puerto Rican lawyer

Other uses 
SNCAC NC.2001 Abeille, French 1940s helicopter
Abeille (local currency), a local currency of Villeneuve-sur-Lot, France
Abeilles FC, Congolese football club

See also